The Lake Erie and Western Railroad was a railroad that operated in Ohio, Indiana and Illinois.  The Lake Erie and Western Depot Historic District at Kokomo, Indiana, was listed on the National Register of Historic Places in 2008.

The beginning
The Seney Syndicate linked several short railroads in Ohio, Indiana, and Illinois to form the Lake Erie and Western Railroad in 1879 and 1880. The Lake Erie and Western extended from the Lake Shore and Michigan Southern Railway at Fremont, Ohio,  westward through Fostoria, Ohio, to Bloomington, Illinois.

Acquisitions
In 1900, the Lake Erie and Western came under the control of the New York Central Railroad.  After operating it as a separate entity for two decades, the New York Central sold the Lake Erie and Western to the Nickel Plate Road in 1922.

Sources 

 

Defunct Illinois railroads
Defunct Indiana railroads
Defunct Ohio railroads
Predecessors of the New York, Chicago and St. Louis Railroad
Bloomington–Normal
Fostoria, Ohio
Former Class I railroads in the United States
Railway companies established in 1887
Railway companies disestablished in 1923
Railroads controlled by the Vanderbilt family